The Spider and the Fly is a 1931 Silly Symphonies cartoon.

Plot
A kitchen is filled with flies. A spider wakes up and plays its web like a harp, attracting a pair of them; the female is trapped, and the male summons the cavalry, which arrives riding bees, riding butterflies to drop pepper bombs, firing champagne bottles, and ultimately setting the web on fire and catching the spider on flypaper when it falls.

Reception
Motion Picture Herald (December 19, 1931): "An Animated Pinnacle: Never in his experience has this reviewer seen a more novel, clever or thoroughly entertaining animated cartoon, than is this Walt Disney Silly Symphony number. An opening night audience at the New York Criterion burst into a storm of applause at its conclusion, and well the most unusual number deserved it. When the fly's sweetheart is enmeshed in the spiders' web, the army, on wings, on the backs of horse-flies with pins for lances and with dragon flies acting as bombing planes, sweeps to her assistance. Dozens of tremendously clever new drawings and original ideas are incorporated in this smart animated subject. By all means play it, and the audience will talk about it for a week."

The Film Daily (December 20, 1931): "A Knockout. This Disney cartoon is one of the best to come along in moons. For basic idea, ingenious workmanship and effective sound and musical accompaniment it is hard to beat. It shows a flock of flies, and a couple of loverbird flies in particular, disporting themselves in a kitchen. A villainous spider lures a lady fly to his net, whereupon her hero rushes to the rescue, finally calling in the assistance of the entire fly army, which vanquishes the spider. Can't miss with any audience."

Home media
The short was released on December 19, 2006, on Walt Disney Treasures: More Silly Symphonies, Volume Two.

References

External links 

American animated short films
1931 short films
1930s Disney animated short films
Silly Symphonies
Animated films about insects
Animated films without speech
Films about spiders
Films about flies
1931 animated films
1931 films
Films directed by Wilfred Jackson
Films produced by Walt Disney
American black-and-white films
Columbia Pictures animated short films
Columbia Pictures short films
1930s American films